Dzierzkowice may refer to the following places in Poland:
Dzierżkowice, Lower Silesian Voivodeship (south-west Poland)
Dzierżkowice, Opole Voivodeship (south-west Poland)
Gmina Dzierzkowice, Lublin Voivodeship (east Poland)
Dzierzkowice, seat of Gmina Dzierzkowice, divided into several localities:
Dzierzkowice-Góry, a village in Gmina Dzierzkowice
Dzierzkowice-Podwody, a village in Gmina Dzierzkowice
Dzierzkowice-Rynek, a village in Gmina Dzierzkowice
Dzierzkowice-Wola, a village in Gmina Dzierzkowice
Dzierzkowice-Zastawie, a village in Gmina Dzierzkowice